Alen Mustafić (born 5 July 1999) is a Bosnian professional footballer who plays as a midfielder for Odense Boldklub.

Mustafić started his professional career at Sarajevo, who loaned him to Slovan Bratislava in 2020. Later that year, after signing permanently with Slovan Bratislava, he was sent on loan to Nitra.

Club career

Early career
Mustafić started playing football at his hometown club Sloboda Tuzla, before joining Sarajevo's youth academy in 2015. He made his professional debut against Radnik Bijeljina on 25 February 2018 at the age of 18. On 15 September 2019, he scored his first professional goal in a triumph over Zvijezda 09.

In January 2020, Mustafić was loaned to Slovak side Slovan Bratislava until the end of season, with an option to make the transfer permanent, which was activated in July. In August, he was sent on a season-long loan to Nitra.

International career
Mustafić was a member of Bosnia and Herzegovina under-19 team under coach Toni Karačić.

Career statistics

Club

Honours
Sarajevo
Bosnian Premier League: 2018–19
Bosnian Cup: 2018–19

Slovan Bratislava
Slovak Super Liga: 2019–20, 2021–22
Slovak Cup: 2019–20

References

External links

1999 births
Living people
Sportspeople from Tuzla
Bosniaks of Bosnia and Herzegovina
Bosnia and Herzegovina Muslims
Bosnia and Herzegovina footballers
Bosnia and Herzegovina youth international footballers
Bosnia and Herzegovina expatriate footballers
Association football midfielders
FK Sarajevo players
ŠK Slovan Bratislava players
FC Nitra players
Odense Boldklub players
Premier League of Bosnia and Herzegovina players
Slovak Super Liga players
Expatriate footballers in Slovakia
Bosnia and Herzegovina expatriate sportspeople in Slovakia
Expatriate footballers in Denmark
Bosnia and Herzegovina expatriate sportspeople in Denmark